is a female Japanese mixed martial artist. She is a former DEEP Flyweight champion and former Smackgirl Flyweight champion. She is tied second for the most bouts among women and is considered as one of the pioneers of women's mixed martial arts.

Background
Influenced by her father, Shinashi started training judo at the age of 15, stopping the discipline after graduating from Nippon Sport Science University at 22. She then started competing in sambo, in which she excelled in international competition.

Mixed martial arts career
After a short amateur career, Shinashi turned pro in 2001.

Smackgirl
Racking an undefeated record of 4–0–1 in her first five bouts, she entered Smackgirl 2002 Lightweight tournament in late 2002. She finished all three bouts and won the tournament title with the second-round submission of Hisae Watanabe.

DEEP
After amassing three more wins in Smackgirl, Shinashi made her promotional debut in DEEP: 13th Impact in early January 2004 and would go on undefeated for ten more bouts, mostly in DEEP.

Smackgirl Flyweight Champion
In November 29, 2005, Shinashi faced Naoko Omuro at Smackgirl: Lightweight Anniversary for the inaugural Smackgirl Flyweight Championship. She won the fight and the championship via unanimous decision.

DEEP Lightweight title shot
After winning the Smackgirl title Shinashi returned to DEEP, submitting Shiho Yamato in the second round at DEEP: 24th Impact. With the win she earned the opportunity compete for the inaugural DEEP Women's Lightweight Championship in a rematch against Hisae Watanabe. She lost the bout via first-round knockout, which marked the first loss of her career.

After bouncing back with two wins, Shinashi defended her Smackgirl Flyweight Championship against Misaki Takimoto on March 11, 2007, with a split decision win.

DEEP Flyweight Championship reign
With two more wins in both promotions, Shinashi entered a four-woman, one-night tournament at DEEP: 34th Impact that would crown the inaugural DEEP Flyweight Champion. She capture the title by first defeating Fukuko Hamada via unanimous decision and then submitting Sachiko Yamamoto in the first round of the final.

After capturing the title, Shinashi suffered her second loss against a professional wrestler Mai Ichii at DEEP: 35th Impact in a non-title bout before submitting Yukiko Seki at DEEP: 38th Impact on October 23, 2008.

Return from hiatus
Having been on hiatus for six years, Shinashi returned to competition in late 2014. She racked nine finish victories with two defeats in DEEP and Road FC before being scheduled to defend her DEEP Flyweight title against Mizuki Oshiro at DEEP: 95 Impact on May 6, 2020. However, the event was cancelled due to the COVID-19 pandemic.

Post-title reign
In August 2020, Shinashi vacated her title due to the pandemic's adverse effects on her training.

With more than three years removed from her previous bout, Shinashi faced Reina Kobayashi at DEEP: 112 Impact on February 11, 2023. She won her return via unanimous decision.

Personal life
Shinashi was married in September 2007 and gave birth to her first child, a son, on July 5, 2009.

Championships and accomplishments
DEEP
DEEP Women's Flyweight Championship (one time; former)Smackgirl'''
Smackgirl Flyweight Championship (one time; only)
One successful title defense

Mixed martial arts record

|-
|Win
|align=center|39–4–2
|Reina Kobayashi
|Decision (unanimous)
|Deep: 112 Impact
|
|align=center|2 
|align=center|5:00 
|Tokyo, Japan
|
|-
| Loss
| align=center| 38–4–2
| Mizuki Oshiro
| TKO (punches)
| Deep: 93 Impact
| 
| align=center| 1
| align=center| 1:51
| Tokyo, Japan
|
|-
| Win
| align=center| 38–3–2
| Madoka Ishibashi
| Submission (armbar)
| Deep: 90 Impact
| 
| align=center| 1
| align=center| 3:05
| Tokyo, Japan
|
|-
| Win
| align=center| 37–3–2
| Ye Jin Jung
| TKO (punches)
| Deep: 83 Impact
| 
| align=center| 1
| align=center| 4:37
| Tokyo, Japan
|
|-
| Win
| align=center| 36–3–2
| Chiaki Ota
| TKO (punches)
| Deep: Cage Impact 2017
| 
| align=center| 1
| align=center| 1:36
| Tokyo, Japan
|
|-
| Loss
| align=center| 35–3–2
| Ye Ji Lee
| Decision (unanimous)
| Road FC 37
| 
| align=center| 3
| align=center| 5:00
| Seoul, South Korea
| 
|-
| Win
| align=center| 35–2–2
| Proof Date
| TKO (punches)
| Deep: 76 Impact
| 
| align=center| 1
| align=center| 1:32
| Tokyo, Japan
|
|-
| Win
| align=center| 34–2–2
| Hee Da Choi
| Submission (rear-naked choke)
| Deep: 73 Impact
| 
| align=center| 2
| align=center| 2:30
| Tokyo, Japan
|
|-
| Win
| align=center| 33–2–2
| Ye Ji Lee
| TKO (punches)
| ROAD FC 24
| 
| align=center| 2
| align=center| 4:53
| Tokyo, Japan
|
|-
| Win
| align=center| 32–2–2
| Emi Yamamoto
| Technical Submission (armbar)
| Deep: 71 Impact
| 
| align=center| 1
| align=center| 1:36
| Tokyo, Japan
|
|-
| Win
| align=center| 31–2–2
| Rika Hamada
| Technical Submission (armbar)
| Deep: Dream Impact 2014: Omisoka Special
| 
| align=center| 1
| align=center| 3:29
| Tokyo, Japan
|
|-
| Win
| align=center| 30–2–2
| Ye Jin Jung
| TKO (punches)
| Deep: 69 Impact
| 
| align=center| 1
| align=center| 2:15
| Tokyo, Japan
|
|-
| Win
| align=center| 29–2–2
| Yukiko Seki
| Submission (armbar)
| Deep: 38 Impact
| 
| align=center| 1
| align=center| 1:32
| Tokyo, Japan
| 
|-
| Loss
| align=center| 28–2–2
| Mai Ichii
| Decision (majority)
| Deep: 35 Impact
| 
| align=center| 2
| align=center| 5:00
| Tokyo, Japan
| 
|-
| Win
| align=center| 28–1–2
| Sachiko Yamamoto
| Submission (armbar)
| rowspan=2 | Deep: 34 Impact
| rowspan=2 | 
| align=center| 1
| align=center| 3:58
| rowspan=2 | Tokyo, Japan
| 
|-
| Win
| align=center| 27–1–2
| Fukuko Hamada
| Decision (unanimous)
| align=center| 2
| align=center| 5:00
| 
|-
| Win
| align=center| 26–1–2
| Akemi Morihara
| Submission (heel hook)
| Smackgirl: Starting Over
| 
| align=center| 1
| align=center| 4:17
| Tokyo, Japan
| 
|-
| Win
| align=center| 25–1–2
| Sachiko Yamamoto
| Submission (straight armbar)
| Deep: 32 Impact
| 
| align=center| 1
| align=center| 3:11
| Tokyo, Japan
|
|-
| Win
| align=center| 24–1–2
| Misaki Takimoto
| Decision (split)
| Smackgirl: Will The Queen Paint The Shinjuku Skies Red?
| 
| align=center| 3
| align=center| 5:00
| Tokyo, Japan
| 
|-
| Win
| align=center| 23–1–2
| Tae Kyung Kim
| Submission (armbar)
| Deep: 27 Impact
| 
| align=center| 1
| align=center| 4:16
| Tokyo, Japan
| 
|-
| Win
| align=center| 22–1–2
| Yuka Okumura
| Submission (armbar)
| HEAT 2
| 
| align=center| 1
| align=center| 0:45
| Nagoya, Japan
| 
|-
| Loss
| align=center| 21–1–2
| Hisae Watanabe
| KO (punch)
| Deep: 25 Impact
| 
| align=center| 1
| align=center| 3:54
| Tokyo, Japan
| 
|-
| Win
| align=center| 21–0–2
| Shiho Yamato
| Submission (armbar)
| Deep: 24 Impact
| 
| align=center| 2
| align=center| 2:20
| Tokyo, Japan
| 
|-
| Win
| align=center| 20–0–2
| Naoko Omuro
| Decision (unanimous)
| Smackgirl: Lightweight Anniversary
| 
| align=center| 3
| align=center| 5:00
| Tokyo, Japan
| 
|-
| Win
| align=center| 19–0–2
| Noriko Okamoto
| Submission (armbar)
| Deep: 20th Impact
| 
| align=center| 1
| align=center| 0:48
| Tokyo, Japan
| 
|-
| Win
| align=center| 18–0–2
| Mari Kaneko
| Decision (unanimous)
| Deep: 19th Impact
| 
| align=center| 2
| align=center| 5:00
| Tokyo, Japan
| 
|-
| Win
| align=center| 17–0–2
| Pamela Vitz
| Submission (armbar)
| Shooto: 5/4 in Korakuen Hall
| 
| align=center| 1
| align=center| 2:13
| Tokyo, Japan
| 
|-
| Draw
| align=center| 16–0–2
| Mari Kaneko
| Draw (unanimous)
| Deep: 18th Impact
| 
| align=center| 2
| align=center| 5:00
| Tokyo, Japan
| 
|-
| Win
| align=center| 16–0–1
| Supannipa Chutipanyo
| Submission (armbar)
| Deep: 16th Impact
| 
| align=center| 1
| align=center| 0:20
| Tokyo, Japan
| 
|-
| Win
| align=center| 15–0–1
| Su Jeong Sim
| Technical submission (armbar)
| Deep: 15th Impact
| 
| align=center| 1
| align=center| 2:50
| Tokyo, Japan
| 
|-
| Win
| align=center| 14–0–1
| Nana Ichikawa
| Submission (heel hook)
| Love Impact 2
| 
| align=center| 1
| align=center| 0:45
| Tokyo, Japan
| 
|-
| Win
| align=center| 13–0–1
| Yuki Furutachi
| Submission (armbar)
| Deep: clubDeep Fukuoka: Team Roken Festival
| 
| align=center| 1
| align=center| 1:28
| Fukuoka, Japan
| 
|-
| Win
| align=center| 12–0–1
| Kayo Nagayasu
| Technical submission (armbar)
| Love Impact 1
| 
| align=center| 1
| align=center| 3:17
| Tokyo, Japan
| 
|-
| Win
| align=center| 11–0–1
| Naoko Omuro
| Decision (unanimous)
| Deep: 13th Impact
| 
| align=center| 2
| align=center| 5:00
| Tokyo, Japan
| 
|-
| Win
| align=center| 10–0–1
| Misaki Takimoto
| Submission (armbar)
| Smackgirl: Third Season 5
| 
| align=center| 1
| align=center| 2:03
| Tokyo, Japan
| 
|-
| Win
| align=center| 9–0–1
| Caroline Hoeberchts
| Submission (armbar)
| Smackgirl: Third Season 3
| 
| align=center| 1
| align=center| 1:52
| Tokyo, Japan
| 
|-
| Win
| align=center| 8–0–1
| Reiko Kawae
| Submission (armbar)
| Smackgirl: Third Season 2
| 
| align=center| 1
| align=center| 2:39
| Tokyo, Japan
| 
|-
| Win
| align=center| 7–0–1
| Hisae Watanabe
| Submission (heel hook)
| Smackgirl: Japan Cup 2002 Grand Final
| 
| align=center| 2
| align=center| 0:34
| Tokyo, Japan
| 
|-
| Win
| align=center| 6–0–1
| Maiko Okada
| Submission (heel hook)
| Smackgirl: Japan Cup 2002 Episode 2
| 
| align=center| 2
| align=center| 2:28
| Tokyo, Japan
| 
|-
| Win
| align=center| 5–0–1
| Miki Katagiri
| Submission (armbar)
| Smackgirl: Japan Cup 2002 Opening Round
| 
| align=center| 1
| align=center| 2:35
| Tokyo, Japan
| 
|-
| Win
| align=center| 4–0–1
| Kinuyo Yoshizumi
| Decision (unanimous)
| Smackgirl: Summer Gate 2002
| 
| align=center| 3
| align=center| 5:00
| Tokyo, Japan
| 
|-
| Draw
| align=center| 3–0–1
| Kinuyo Yoshizumi
| Draw
| Shoot Boxing: S-Cup 2002
| 
| align=center| 3
| align=center| 5:00
| Yokohama, Japan
| 
|-
| Win
| align=center| 3–0–0
| Aiko Koike
| Submission (armbar)
| Smackgirl: Royal Smack 2002
| 
| align=center| 1
| align=center| 1:01
| Tokyo, Japan
| 
|-
| Win
| align=center| 2–0–0
| Misaki Takimoto
| Submission (armbar)
| Smackgirl: God Bless You
| 
| align=center| 1
| align=center| 4:32
| Tokyo, Japan
| 
|-
| Win
| align=center| 1–0–0
| Aya Koyama
| Submission (armbar)
| AX – Vol. 2: We Want To Shine
| 
| align=center| 1
| align=center| 2:29
| Tokyo, Japan
|

References

External links
 Satoko Shinashi Awakening Profile

See also
 List of current mixed martial arts champions
 List of female mixed martial artists

1977 births
Japanese female mixed martial artists
Japanese practitioners of Brazilian jiu-jitsu
Female Brazilian jiu-jitsu practitioners
Japanese female judoka
Japanese sambo practitioners
Living people
Nippon Sport Science University alumni
Atomweight mixed martial artists
Deep (mixed martial arts) champions
Mixed martial artists utilizing judo
Mixed martial artists utilizing sambo
Mixed martial artists utilizing Brazilian jiu-jitsu
21st-century Japanese women